The main building of Moscow State University (in Russian Гла́вное зда́ние МГУ) a , 36-level (in its central part) skyscraper in Moscow, Russia. Designed by Lev Rudnev as the headquarters of Moscow State University, it is the tallest of seven Moscow skyscrapers in the Stalinist architectural style constructed between 1947 and 1953. It was until 1990 the tallest building in Europe before being surpassed by the Messeturm in Germany. It remains the tallest educational building in the world.

Features

Its roof is topped by a 58-metre spire which ends with a 12-ton five-pointed star. Lateral towers are lower than the central one; two 18 and 9 storey dormitory wings define, with the central corpus of the complex, a cour d'honneur courtyard.

Among the statues which decorate the building is a sculpture by Vera Muchina representing a couple of students and a statue by N. Tomsky of Mikhail Lomonosov (1711–1765), the founder of Moscow University. The University premises cover around 1.6 square kilometres. The complex was partially renovated in 2000.

The Main Building of Moscow State University is not open to the general public. Visitors from outside the university must be pre-approved by their university host and must submit their domestic passport (Russian) or international passport in order to gain entry.

History

The leading architect Boris Iofan bid for the skyscraper project in 1947 but the job was assigned to Lev Rudnev, because Iofan made a mistake placing his draft skyscraper right on the edge of Sparrow Hills, a site concerned with a potential landslide hazard. Rudnev had already built important edifices like the M. V. Frunze Military Academy (1932–1937) and the Marshals' Apartments (Sadovaya-Kudrinskaya, 28, 1947), earning esteem of the Communist Party. He set the building 800 meters away from the cliff. The chief of the engineers' team was Vsevolod Nikolaevich Nasonov.

The main tower, which consumed over 40,000 tons of steel for its framework and 130,000 cubic metres of concrete, was inaugurated on September 1, 1953. At 240 metres tall, it was the 7th tallest building of the world  as well as the tallest in Europe. Its European height record held until 1990 when it was surpassed by the Messeturm in Frankfurt, Germany. It was also, and still remains, the tallest educational building in the world.

Moscow University is probably the best known of Rudnev's buildings, for which he was awarded the Stalin Prize in 1949.
The University skyline inspired various buildings in the socialist countries, like the Palace of Culture and Science in Warsaw, and also the logo of 1980 Moscow Olympic Games.

See also

Education in Russia

References

External links
 
 
 

School buildings completed in 1953
Stalinist architecture
Seven Sisters (Moscow)
Skyscrapers in Moscow
Cultural heritage monuments of regional significance in Moscow